The Hôtel Costes is a luxury hotel in Paris, France. Located at 7 Rue de Castiglione, it is perhaps best known for its bar and courtyard café.

History

The hotel was commissioned by the Costes brothers, Jean-Louis and Gilbert, from the designer and interior architect Jacques Garcia in 1991. It opened in 1995 at 239 rue St-Honoré. The hotel is now renowned as a den of opulence and was built in conjunction with Klay Robson as Developer and construction consultant (the design maxim was "all things in excess").

Hôtel Costes is not to be confused with the hotel Costes K, which is run by the same family, but is not located in Paris' first arrondissement.

In 2012, the Hotel started working on a new musical direction designed by former EMI/Virgin France Head of A&R Thierry Planelle and music supervisor Frederic Schindler , which took over the music curation after Stéphane Pompougnac's departure following the release of the last lounge music series compilation in September 2011.     

In 2016, Hôtel Costes signed a partnership with Apple and launched a worldwide Curator channel  on Apple Music . The updated musical direction is reflected on the new streaming-only Costes Selections, translating the "best of" of the Hotel's monthly music programming, which is also available live on the Hotel's webradio .  The Costes Apple Music Channel  features a monthly 15-song compilation featuring premieres and some exclusive unreleased songs curated in an eclectic and contemporary approach, ranging from electronica to 60s French chanson. At the end of every year, a Collection showcasing Costes favourite 50 tracks of the year is published.    

In 2014, Jean-Louis Costes bought the adjacent Hotel Lotti, opened in 1910. He gutted it and turned it into a new wing of the hotel, which opened in 2020, giving it a new main entrance on Rue de Castiglione.

References

External links
Hotelcostes.com

Costes
Compilation album series
Buildings and structures in the 1st arrondissement of Paris
Hotels established in 1991
1991 establishments in France